The Oslo Commitments were five international-scope goals agreed upon on May 12, 2010, by the Government of Norway and the UNDP, at a meeting in Geneva, Switzerland.

The Commitments were concluded with less than five years to achieve the Millennium Development Goals (MDGs). The conference brought together government representatives, international organizations, and civil society organizations to accelerate global efforts against armed violence. While reaffirming the Geneva Declaration on Armed Violence and Development, the participants agreed to the following commitments:

 To support, where appropriate, the inclusion of armed violence reduction and prevention in the Outcome Document of the High Level Plenary Meeting on the MDGs and in subsequent MDG achievement strategies through 2015; 
 To measure and monitor the incidence and impact of armed violence at national and sub-national levels in a transparent way, and develop a set of targets and indicators to assess progress in efforts to achieve measurable reductions in armed violence;
 To recognise the rights of victims of armed violence in a non-discriminatory manner, including provision for their adequate care and rehabilitation, as well as their social and economic inclusion, in accordance with national laws and applicable international obligations;
 To enhance the potential of development to reduce and prevent armed violence by integrating armed violence prevention and reduction strategies into international, regional, national and sub-national development plans, programmes and assistance strategies;
 To strengthen international cooperation and assistance, including South-South cooperation, to develop national and sub-national capacities for armed violence prevention and reduction and achievement of the MDGs.

References

External links 
 Oslo Commitments website
 UNDP Armed Violence
 Geneva Declaration on Armed Violence and Development
 Millennium Development Goals

Millennium Development Goals